August Meier (April 30, 1923 – March 19, 2003) was a professor of history at Kent State University and an author. He was a leading scholar on African American history. He edited several books with Elliott Rudwick. The New York Public Library has a collection of his papers.

Raised in Newark, New Jersey, Meier graduated from Barringer High School. He graduated from Oberlin College and received an M.A. in 1947 and Phd in 1957 from Columbia University where he studied under Henry Steele Commager and published his dissertation, Foundational Negro Thought in America: 1880–1915 (1963).

References

1923 births
2003 deaths
Barringer High School alumni
Kent State University faculty
Writers from Newark, New Jersey
American writers
Columbia University alumni
Oberlin College alumni
Historians from New Jersey